Antiscopa acompa is a moth in the family Crambidae. It was first described by Edward Meyrick in 1884. It is endemic to New Zealand and is found both the North and South Islands. The species inhabits native forest and adult moths are attracted to light.

Taxonomy 
This species was first named Scoparia acompa by Edward Meyrick in 1884. In 1885 Meyrick gave a detailed description of the species using specimens collected near Lake Wakatipu at 1,200 feet. George Hudson discussed and illustrated this species under the name Scoparia acompa in his 1928 book The butterflies and moths of New Zealand. In 1964 Eugene Munroe placed this species in the genus Antiscopa. This placement was accepted by John S. Dugdale in 1988. The male holotype, collected at Lake Wakatipu, is held at the Natural History Museum, London.

Description

In 1885 Meyrick gave a detailed description of the species as follows:

Meyrick regarded this species as distinctive as a result of its forewing colouration and markings. However this species is very similar in appearance to Antiscopa epicomia but can be distinguished as A. acompa has a thicker antemedian forewing line.

Distribution

This species is endemic to New Zealand. It has been collected in both the North and South Islands.

Habitat
This species inhabits native forest.

Behaviour
Adults have been recorded on wing from October to February. Adults of this species are attracted to light.

References

Moths described in 1884
Scopariinae
Endemic fauna of New Zealand
Moths of New Zealand
Taxa named by Edward Meyrick
Endemic moths of New Zealand